Krông Ana is a district (huyện) of Đắk Lắk province in the Central Highlands region of Vietnam.

As of 2003 the district had a population of 199,543. The district capital lies at Buôn Trấp.

References

Districts of Đắk Lắk province